Yandy.com is an American online retailer and fashion design company focusing on lingerie, swimwear, Halloween costumes, and women's apparel.

History
Yandy.com is an online women's intimates apparel retailer, originally based out of the residence of its co-founders. The company was founded in 2007 by Chad Horstman and his brother Evan in Scottsdale, Arizona. By 2018 the company employed over 80 full-time employees and occupies a  warehouse.

Chad Horstman served as the company's CEO from its founding until 2017 and remains a member of its board of directors. In October 2017, the company elevated its CTO Aras Koktas and CFO Jeffrey Watton to Co-CEO titles.

The firm first sold exclusively lingerie but expanded to Halloween costumes in their first year. In 2010, it began selling its own branded costumes. It now creates lingerie, everyday intimates, Halloween costumes, swimwear, and other women's apparel. Halloween costumes have included looks inspired by political figures, celebrities, memes, cultural events, and popular culture trends, along with conventional Halloween themes.

In December 2019, Yandy was purchased by Playboy Enterprises.

Fashion shows and partnerships

Fashion Shows 
The firm's swimwear collections have been shown at New York Fashion Week, Miami Swim Week, and Scottsdale Fashion Week. It also produced the first Halloween costume fashion show at New York Fashion Week in September 2016, featuring 39  costumes.

Partnerships 
In 2017, the firm became the swimsuit sponsor for the 2017 Miss USA Pageant, providing the swimsuits for each of the  contestants, later selling each design  through its website. The swimsuits were  designed by Pilar Quintana-Williams, the company's vice-president of merchandising. In July 2017, the company received  licensing for their Baywatch swimwear collection.

Criticism

Brave Red Maiden Costume 
In September 2018, Yandy.com introduced a costume they called "Brave Red Maiden" which was apparent that it had been designed as a "sexy" knockoff from The Handmaid's Tale.  Several news sources picked up the story and criticized the choice to create and sell this costume.   The firm quickly withdrew the costume from their site and issued an apology. Yandy.com has offered Native Americans costumes since it began selling Halloween products and accessories, but does not currently list them on their site.

References

External links 
 

Lingerie brands
Lingerie retailers
Swimwear manufacturers
Online clothing retailers of the United States